The Hugo Award for Best Fan Artist is given each year for artists of works related to science fiction or fantasy which appeared in low- or non-paying publications such as semiprozines or fanzines. A Hugo Award for professional artists is also given. The Hugo Awards have been described as "a fine showcase for speculative fiction" and "the best known literary award for science fiction writing".

The fan award was first presented in 1967 and has been awarded annually. Beginning in 1996, Retrospective Hugo Awards, or "Retro Hugos", have been available to be awarded for years 50, 75, or 100 years prior in which no awards were given. To date, Retro Hugo awards have been awarded for 1939, 1941, 1943–1946, 1951, and 1954, although only the 1946 and 1951 Retro Hugos received sufficient nominations for the Fan Artist Hugo to make the ballot.

Hugo Award nominees and winners are chosen by supporting or attending members of the annual World Science Fiction Convention, or Worldcon, and the presentation evening constitutes its central event. The selection process is defined in the World Science Fiction Society Constitution as instant-runoff voting with six nominees, except in the case of a tie. The works on the ballot are those six most-nominated by members that year, with no limit on the number of works that can be nominated. Initial nominations are made by members in January through March, while voting on the ballot of six nominations is performed roughly in April through July, subject to change depending on when that year's Worldcon is held. Prior to 2017, the final ballot was five works; it was changed that year to six, with each initial nominator limited to five nominations. Worldcons are generally held near Labor Day and in a different city around the world each year.

During the 58 nomination years, 79 artists have been nominated; 32 of these have won, including co-winners and Retro Hugos. Brad W. Foster has received the largest number of awards, with 8 wins out of 27 nominations. William Rotsler and Tim Kirk have won five awards, from twenty-three and eight nominations respectively. The only other artists to win more than twice are Teddy Harvia, with four out of twenty nominations, Alexis A. Gilliland, with four out of eight, and Frank Wu, also with four out of eight.

Winners and nominees 
In the following tables, the years correspond to the date of the ceremony. Artists are eligible based on their work of the previous calendar year. Entries with a blue background and an asterisk (*) next to the artist's name have won the award; those with a white background are the nominees on the short-list.

  *   Winners

Retro Hugos 
Beginning with the 1996 Worldcon, the World Science Fiction Society created the concept of "Retro Hugos", in which the Hugo award could be retroactively awarded for 50, 75, or 100 years prior. Retro Hugos may only be awarded for years in which a Worldcon was hosted, but no awards were originally given. Retro Hugos have been awarded eight times, for 1939, 1941, 1943–1946, 1951, and 1954. Only the 1946 and 1951 Retro Hugos received enough nominations for the Fan Artist Hugo to make the ballot.

References

External links
The Hugo Awards official website

Visual arts awards
Awards established in 1967
Fan Artist